Potiatuca is a genus of beetles in the family Cerambycidae, containing the following species:

 Potiatuca carioca Monne & Monne, 2009
 Potiatuca ingridae Galileo & Martins, 2006
 Potiatuca serrana Monne & Monne, 2009

References

Apomecynini